Luke Francis Burns (May 16, 1881 –; August 27, 1956) was an American lawyer and politician.

Burns was born in Osman, Manitowoc County, Wisconsin and went to the Manitowoc, Wisconsin schools. He went to University of Wisconsin–Oshkosh, Northwestern University Pritzker School of Law, and University of Wisconsin Law School. Burns practiced law in Virginia, St. Louis County, Minnesota and served as the Virginia City Attorney and the Kinney Village Attorney. He also served as the attorney for the Virginia Board of Education. Burns was also admitted to the Wisconsin bar. He served in the Minnesota House of Representatives in 1943 and 1944. Burns died in a hospital in Wausau, Wisconsin and was buried in Wausau, Wisconsin.

References

1881 births
1956 deaths
People from Manitowoc County, Wisconsin
People from Virginia, Minnesota
University of Wisconsin–Oshkosh alumni
Northwestern University Pritzker School of Law alumni
University of Wisconsin Law School alumni
Minnesota lawyers
Wisconsin lawyers
Members of the Minnesota House of Representatives